Ultra Electronics Holdings is a British defence and security company. It was listed on the London Stock Exchange and was a constituent of the FTSE 250 Index until it was acquired by Cobham, which is itself owned by Advent International.

History

Early activities

The company that would eventually become Ultra Electronics was started by wireless specialist Teddy Rosen as Edward E. Rosen & Co. during 1920. The firm was initially focused upon the manufacture of high quality headphones and loudspeakers. During 1923, the company relocated to new premises at Harrow Road, London. In 1925, a new company, known as Ultra Electric Ltd., was formed; the Ultra name had been previously used for one of its products, the first commercial moving iron loudspeaker.

During 1930, Ultra launched its first all-electric radio receiver. During 1931, the firm introduced its first mains-powered wireless set, known as the Ultra Twin Cub. That same year, Ultra received its first order from the aviation industry, having been placed by the Japanese Kawasaki Company. As a result of further expansion, the company moved to larger premises at Erskine Road, Chalk Farm, NW3 in 1932; three years later, a new  factory at Western Avenue, Acton.

During the 1930s, Ultra manufactured a wide range of domestic radio receivers including the Blue Fox, Lynx, Panther and Tiger models. In 1939, the company presented a television receiver to the market for the BBC High Definition Television Service which was transmitted on 405 lines from the studios at Alexandra Palace, north London.

During the Second World War, Ultra diversified into aviation; the Short Stirling was the first aircraft to incorporate their products, the company acting as a subcontractor to produce tails and bomb doors for the bomber. Ultra would produce a wide range of aerostructures for numerous aircraft throughout the conflict. The firm solely focused on wartime demands, only relaunching itself into the civilian market during 1947, although it would continue to have an interest in the military sector during the post-war period.

Post-war
Ultra continued to manufacture products for the aviation industry after the war. Various engines, including the Armstrong Siddeley Mamba and the Rolls-Royce Avon, incorporated components such as temperature regulators, fuel flow valves, and throttle controls produced by Ultra. Electronic control systems would become a key part of the company's product range.

In 1953, Ultra started manufacturing television sets. During 1956, the firm opened a new factory at Gosport for the production of both televisions and radio sets; Ultra acquired rival company Pilot Radio & Television in 1959. During the following year, Ultra reorganised itself, splitting into two divisions, one specialising in domestic radio and television and the other focused on all other electronic products. In 1961, Ultra's consumer electronics interests became part of Thorn Electrical Industries, who continued to manufacture products using the Ultra brandname until 1974.

As a result of the acquisition, the remainder of the company became Ultra Electronics Ltd. Amongst its varied product range at this time, it produced the "Jezebel" and "Mini-Jezebel" sonobuoys. In 1962, Ultra developed their Search and Rescue and Homing (SARAH) radio beacon, this would be widely used throughout the world. Various subsystems of Concorde, include the droop nose controls and the full authority engine controls, incorporated Ultra technologies.

During 1977, Ultra Electronics was bought by the Dowty Group. In 1982, the firm became a component of Dowty Group's newly founded Electronic Systems Division. During 1990, the division was relocated to Loudwater, Buckinghamshire.

Reemergence
In 1993, Ultra was the subject of a management buyout, led by Julian Blogh, of seven Dowty Group plc companies which formed the Dowty Group Electronic Systems Divisions, which had been previously acquired by TI Group during 1992. The newly independent company relocated to Greenford, Middlesex during 1994.In September 1995, Ultra Electronics received its first major export order from the American government, to supply support equipment for its McDonnell Douglas AV-8B Harrier II fleet. It was floated on the London Stock Exchange in 1996.

During the late 1990s, Ultra Electronics began to vigorously promote its active noise control systems, marketed as UltraQuiet: the firm argued that aircraft manufacturers can deploy it to decrease cabin noise, which has been a traditionally prevalent drawback of turboprop-powered aircraft, such as regional airliners, in comparison to their jet-powered counterparts. It also developed further noise reduction technologies during this period. Various companies, including Bombardier Aerospace and Airbus, have chosen to incorporate Ultra Electronics' noise reduction and vibration dampening products onto their aircraft.

According to Flight International, since regaining its independence in the 1990s, the corporate strategy of Ultra Electronics appears to have been slanted towards maintaining a diverse product range, avoiding any large exposures to a single market, as well as being intentionally widely dispersed geographically. In 2000, Ultra Electronics acquired Datel Ferranti Group. It also acquired American voice communications provider Audiopack Technologies in 2004. By 2005, Ultra Electronics was ranked as the 66th  biggest aerospace company in the world: at this point in time, the American market accounted for around one-third of the business's turnover.

In August 2021, the British aerospace and defence company, Cobham, agreed to acquire Ultra Electronics for £2.6bn. A merger enquiry into the anticipated acquisition (Ultra Electronics is a key national security and the defence contractor, Cobham, is American owned) was completed in January 2022, with a report being passed to the Secretary of State for Business, Energy and Industrial Strategy, Kwasi Kwarteng. In July 2022, Kwarteng announced that the acquisition was cleared to proceed.

Operations

The company operates under five strategic business units; Maritime, Intelligence & Communications, Precision Control Systems, Energy and Forensic Technology. It has facilities in the UK, North America and Australia. In January 2020, Ultra launched new branding.

See also 
 Aerospace industry in the United Kingdom

References 

1920 establishments in England
Aircraft component manufacturers of the United Kingdom
Companies listed on the London Stock Exchange
Defence companies of the United Kingdom
Electronics companies established in 1920
Electronics companies of the United Kingdom
Electronics industry in London
Manufacturing companies based in London
Sonar manufacturers
Radio manufacturers